The 2014 World Sambo Championships was held in Narita, Japan between the 20 and 24 November 2014. This tournament included competition in both Sambo, and Combat Sambo.

Medal overview

Combat Sambo Events

Men's Sambo Events

Women's events

Medal table

References

External links 
http://www.eurosambo.com/en/competitions/2014/151/

World Sambo Championships
World Sambo Championships, 2006
Narita, Chiba
2014 in sambo (martial art)